Neezam Abdul Aziz (born 25 April 1991) is a Singaporean professional footballer who currently plays for Warriors in the S.League. He plays as a goalkeeper.

Career 
Neezam Aziz has been involved in professional football since the age of 20. He started his S.League career with Home United but a constant name on the bench.

He moved on to Courts Young Lions in 2012, whereby he got his playing time as a first-team keeper. In 2013, he played for LionsXII and won the 2013 Malaysia Super League title. As he did not enjoy much playing time as he did in the Young Lions, he joined the Warriors in 2014.

References

External links 
N. Aziz at int.soccerway.com

1991 births
Living people
Singaporean footballers
Association football goalkeepers
Home United FC players
Young Lions FC players
LionsXII players
Warriors FC players
Singapore Premier League players